Hughes Hall Boat Club (HHBC) is the rowing club for members of Hughes Hall, Cambridge. HHBC houses its boats in the  boathouse. HHBC has a history of consistently impressing on several fronts. It has risen rapidly through the Cambridge College rowing ranks since its inception in the 1970s to become one of the most successful clubs on the river, frequently winning the prestigious accolade of Blades in the annual Lent and May Bumps Regatta. The Men's first crew won blades in the May Bumps in 1993, 1995, 1996, 1997, 2001, 2002, 2003, 2004, 2007, 2009, 2011, 2013, 2014, 2019, and 2022.

History
Hughes Hall first competed in the May Bumps in 1979 when the men started at 112th on the river and went down two places while the women started at 20th on the river and went down three places. The following year the men achieved HHBC's first ever bump on Sidney Sussex M6 but the women had to wait until 1999 to achieve their first May bump.

In 2003 there was an official merger with the boat club of Lucy Cavendish College, an all-women's college of Cambridge University. The result was a combined club formally recognised by the Cambridge University Combined Boat Clubs as the "Hughes Hall/ Lucy Cavendish Combined Boat Club". This combination was the only of its type at Cambridge.

Since the merging of the two college boat clubs, Hughes Hall/ Lucy Cavendish have enjoyed significant advances marked by three squads winning blades during the May Bumps 2009, including a 10 place gain by M2. It was also the first time the boat club fielded four crews into the May Bumps. Hughes Hall/ Lucy Cavendish have won the Pegasus Cup, awarded to the boat club that shows the largest cumulative advancement at the bumps, three times – in 2007, 2009 and 2014. They are the only club to have won the Pegasus Cup on more than one occasion.

In October 2017 it was announced that the two college clubs were to separate.

Hughes Hall admits many students on one-year degrees. As such, the boat club trains many novices each year. Top performers are often given opportunities in the first VIII. Hughes Hall is also known for producing many of those rowers who represent CUBC at The Boat Race. In 2009 half the roster of Goldie, the 2nd Varsity boat, were from Hughes. This continued in 2010, including CUBC President Deaglen McEachern who was the first representative from Hughes Hall to hold this post. In the 2019 Boat Race, Dara Alizadeh was Light Blue president in the victorious Cambridge crew which also contained fellow Hughesian Grant Bitler.

Other appearances
In 2008, the women flew to Galway Ireland to race in the Tribesman Head of the River race and qualified for the Intermediate Coxed Fours in 2008 at Henley Women's Regatta. The Hughes Hall/ Lucy Cavendish women also competed in the Women's Eights Head of River Race (WeHorr) for the first time in 2009. They were the only Cambridge college to enter two boats. The first VIII overtook five boats and came 144th out of 291. W2 placed 272nd.

References

 CUCBC/ Cambridge University Combined Boat Club
 Hughes Hall Boat Club
 Lucy Cavendish College Boat Club

Rowing clubs of the University of Cambridge
Hughes Hall, Cambridge
Lucy Cavendish College, Cambridge
Rowing clubs in Cambridgeshire
Rowing clubs in England
Rowing clubs of the River Cam